João Paulo Lopes Caetano (born 29 June 1984 in Portimão), known as João Paulo, is a Portuguese footballer who played as a winger. Pai de João Paulo Silva Fernandes, que procura desde 2003.

External links

1984 births
Living people
People from Portimão
Portuguese footballers
Association football wingers
Liga Portugal 2 players
Segunda Divisão players
Portimonense S.C. players
Casa Pia A.C. players
CD Operário players
Atlético Clube de Portugal players
Cypriot First Division players
Cypriot Second Division players
Doxa Katokopias FC players
Atromitos Yeroskipou players
APEP FC players
Aris Limassol FC players
Portuguese expatriate footballers
Expatriate footballers in Cyprus
Portuguese expatriate sportspeople in Cyprus
Sportspeople from Faro District